Bernice is a given name.

People
Some notable individuals with the name include:

 Berenice (daughter of Herod Agrippa I) (28 AD-?), spelled "Bernice" in the New Testament
 Bernice Pauahi Bishop (1831-1884), a Hawaiian princess
 Bernice Coppieters (born 1970), Belgian ballet dancer
 Bernice Gera (1931-1992), the first female umpire in professional baseball
Bernice Gottlieb (born 1931), early leader in the trans-racial adoption movement
Bernice Kentner (1929-2018), American cosmetologist and author
 Bernice King (born 1963), Baptist minister and daughter of Dr. Martin Luther King
 Bernice Neugarten (1916-2001), professor and researcher in the field of aging 
 Bernice Petkere (1901–2000), American songwriter dubbed the "Queen of Tin Pan Alley" by Irving Berlin
 Bernice Rubens (1928–2004), Booker Prize-winning Welsh novelist
 Bernice F. Sisk (1910-1995), American Democratic Congressman from California

Fictional characters
 Bernice, Bert's pet pigeon from the children's television series Sesame Street
 Bernice, a reality television character in the truTV series South Beach Tow, played by Lakatriona Brunson
 Bernice Blackstock,  from the British soap opera Emmerdale
 Bernice Clasky, in the Adam Sandler movie "Spanglish"
 Bernice Clifton, in the TV series Designing Women
 Bernice Fish, in the TV series Fish
 Bernice Halper, the title character's best friend in the Luann comic strip
 Bernice Hibbert, a recurring character on The Simpsons TV show
 Bernice Summerfield, a companion of the seventh Dr. Who in novels
 Bernice Waverley, in the Australian TV drama series City Homicide
 Bernice the Whiffle Hen in Popeye the Sailor

See also 
 Bernice (disambiguation)